Pycnobotrya is a monotypic genus of plant in the family Apocynaceae found in tropical Africa.  the World Checklist of Selected Plant Families recognises the single species Pycnobotrya nitida.

Its fragrant flowers feature a dark pink corolla, sometimes with pale yellow throat. Habitat is forest, often on river banks. Local medicinal uses include as a treatment for chest infections, haematuria, diarrhoea, dysentery and bronchitis. P. nitida is found in Nigeria, Cameroon, the Central African Republic, Gabon, the Republic of Congo and the Democratic Republic of Congo.

References

Rauvolfioideae
Plants used in traditional African medicine
Flora of Nigeria
Flora of West-Central Tropical Africa
Monotypic Apocynaceae genera